Best Friend (TC: 好朋友) is a Cantopop album by Edmond Leung.

Track listing
0:11 (零時十一分)
Best Friend (不問自戀)
I Am Accustomed to You (習慣你)
Free Lunch (免費午餐)
Stop Breathing (斷了氣)
To Be Continued (待續)
One Day Off (休息一天)
Moonlight Pool (月光游泳池)
Rainy night (流離夜雨)

Charts

Music awards

References

Edmond Leung albums
1997 albums